The Farmington River is a river,  in length along its main stem, located in northwest Connecticut with major tributaries extending into southwest Massachusetts. Historically, the river played an important role in small-scale manufacturing in towns along its course, but it is now mainly used for recreation and drinking water.

Geography 
Headwaters for the two branches of the Farmington River, the East Branch and West Branch, are found in southwestern Massachusetts, though only the West Branch officially begins north of the Connecticut border. The West Branch begins at the outlet of Hayden Pond in Otis, Massachusetts. The East Branch begins in Hartland, Connecticut at the confluence of Pond, Hubbard and Valley Brooks.  However, this branch has been impounded along the first 11 miles of its course to form the Barkhamsted Reservoir and Lake McDonough; it does not assume a river-like appearance until it exits Lake McDonough in New Hartford, Connecticut. The East Branch and West Branch join in New Hartford, Connecticut, one mile south of the lake. Upper reaches of the river generally flow southward, but the river turns northward in Farmington, Connecticut, and runs mostly north and east until it flows into the Connecticut River in Windsor.

History 
Sites built adjacent to the river by nomadic peoples at the end of the last Ice Age, 12,400 years BP of the Younger Dryas indicate the presence of the earliest peoples to populate the region that would become known as southern New England. In the winter of 2019, the remains of the site were excavated in Avon, along with stone tools and artifacts constructed from materials in neighboring regions.

The upper Connecticut and Farmington River valleys were the lands of the Native American indigenous people called the Massaco, a sub-tribe of the Tunxis, who were affiliated with the Wappinger. The name Tunxis, a word in the Quiripi family of Eastern Algonquian languages, derives from the indigenous term Wuttunkshau for "the point where the river bends". Halfway through the course of the river, in a floodplain in the town of Farmington at the base of the Metacomet Ridge, the flow of the Farmington River changes its direction to the northeast, where it eventually joins up with the Connecticut River in Windsor.

When Europeans first arrived, the "Tunxis Sepus" territory consisted of a 165-mile square area bounded by Simsbury to the North, Wallingford to the South, to the northwest by Mohawk country, and on the east by the current towns of Windsor, Hartford and Wethersfield.  In 1645, the Town of Farmington, Connecticut was named by the Connecticut General Assembly, and this was re-affirmed in 1650 by the execution of a deed by the General Assembly and the reservation of land for the "Tunxis Indians" near "Indian Neck" on the east bank of the Farmington River. A group of twenty wigwams existed in Farmington at the beginning of the eighteenth century, but only four or five families resided in the settlement by 1761

The land of the Massaco was subsequently purchased by the Dutch.  This and its settlement during the era of the Connecticut Colony are described in the early history of Simsbury.

The Spoonville Dam, built on the Farmington River in 1899 below the Tariffville Gorge in East Granby, was breached in the Flood of 1955 and remained as a partial dam for several decades before being removed in July 2012. The dam, as well as the bridge crossing the Farmington River downstream at Route 187, derived its name from the silver plating factory erected in 1840 on the north bank of the river. It was the first factory of its kind in the United States.

Historical crossings 
Several bridges constructed in the 19th century and early 20th century still span the Farmington River to this day. Among these are:
 Farmington River Railroad Bridge, a stone arch bridge in Windsor, Connecticut built in 1867

 Drake Hill Road Bridge, a Parker through-truss bridge in Simsbury, Connecticut constructed in 1892
 Town Bridge, a Parker through-truss bridge in Canton, Connecticut constructed by the Berlin Iron Bridge Company in 1895
 Richards Corner Bridge, a Pratt through-truss bridge in New Hartford, Connecticut built in 1930 which spans the East Branch Farmington River
 Pleasant Valley Bridge, a Parker through-truss bridge in Barkhamsted, Connecticut built in 1939
 Unionville Bridge, a Warren through-truss bridge in Unionville, Connecticut built in 1939

Recreation 

The river has several whitewater sections that are popular for tubing and kayaking.  One of these, the colloquial "Upper Farmington" section of the West Branch in New Boston, Massachusetts, is about 7 miles (11 km) long.  It is Class 2 through farm and woods scenery to an iron bridge, where kayak and canoe slalom races are held.  Below the bridge the river becomes Class 3-4, with a short gorge with several abrupt drops. The biggest of these is about four feet at Decoration Rock.  Below, the river continues fast and technical with many rocks and constant maneuvering required.  The river is continuously rapid, leading through larger drops at Battering Ram rapid and Corkscrew.  Eventually the river flattens to Class 2 until a final, ledge rapid at Bear's Den, just above the reservoir.  The Upper Farmington is barely runnable (very scratchy with many exposed rocks and pinning possibilities) during fall dam releases, and is a much better run at levels of about 600 cubic feet per second (16,990 L/s), or about 5 feet (1.5 m) on the internet gauge for that section.

A second whitewater section is found in Tariffville, Connecticut, one mile (1.6 km) of technical Class 3 water which is runnable all year round. The river is normally paddled at levels between 1.5 and 2.75 feet (45–75 cm) on the internet gauge; above 2.5 feet (75 cm) it becomes significantly heavier and more dangerous. This section includes the famous T-ville Hole, where kayakers can practice hole surfing and freestyle moves above a flat pool.  Below the Hole is a broken dam, where the river funnels through an abrupt four foot drop into a large wave.  This area is popular with swimmers in summer, and it is risky due to heavy currents and undercut rocks.  There have been at least three fatal drownings in the Tariffville Gorge section, primarily people who were not properly prepared or trained for the heavy rapids and pinning obstacles in the gorge.  Paddlers without helmets, lifejackets and Class 3 whitewater skills should end downriver trips at Tariffville Park, just above the start of the gorge.

Other whitewater areas include Satan's Kingdom in New Hartford, Connecticut, which is popular with tubers, and the Crystal Rapids section in Collinsville and Unionville, Connecticut, which is about four miles (6 km) of Class 1-3 training waters with a bicycle and pedestrian path on the right side of the river. Entrance to the park is free. A service will also pick tubers up and drop them off at certain points.

Dams and power generation 
The west branch of the river includes two hydroelectric dams in West Hartland and Colebrook, run by the Metropolitan District Commission of Connecticut.
The largest dam on the east branch is the Saville Dam, which impounds the Barkhamsted Reservoir.

The Rainbow Dam, a  dam with a hydroelectric generator and a fish ladder, dams the river at Windsor, a few miles before the river flows into the Connecticut River.

A number of other dams have been built on the river since European settlement, usually to power mills and other industry.  A few, such as in Collinsville, are still mostly intact.  The Collinsville Renewable Energy Promotion Act (H.R. 316;113th Congress) would instruct the Federal Energy Regulatory Commission to issue licenses to the town of Canton, Connecticut, to restart two small power dams along the river.  The bill passed the United States House of Representatives on February 12, 2013, but has not yet become law.

Water released from or flowing over the Otis Reservoir dam enters the Farmington River just north of Reservoir Road in Otis, Massachusetts.  Significant quantities of water are released during the fall in order to drop the reservoir water level for the winter.

Natural resources and conservation 
Much of the Farmington River has been designated as part of the United States National Wild & Scenic Rivers System. The first such designation on the river was bestowed in 1994 and included 14 miles of water, mostly along the Farmington River West Branch but also a section of the river's main stem, from Hartland to the New Hartford-Canton town line. In 2019, this designation was extended 1.1 miles further downstream to the confluence with the Nepaug River. Most of the Farmington River main stem and the Salmon Brook tributary system, totalling 61.7 miles of additional water, were also designated Wild & Scenic in 2019. The Farmington River Coordinating Committee oversees the implementation of management plans for the designated runs of the Farmington River and includes representatives from towns along the river, the Connecticut Department of Energy and Environmental Protection, Metropolitan District Commission, National Park Service, Farmington River Watershed Association and Farmington River Anglers Association.

The Farmington River and its tributaries are known to contain 11 species of freshwater mussels. The Farmington has the highest mussel species diversity of any tributary to the Connecticut, lacking only the Yellow lampmussel, which is found only in the mainstem of the Connecticut from Turners Falls, MA downriver to Windsor, CT.

Photographs of notable places

See also
List of rivers of Connecticut

References

External links
Farmington River Watershed Association
USGS site
Farmington River Paddling Maps
Farmington River Anglers Association

Rivers of Berkshire County, Massachusetts
Farmington, Connecticut
Windsor, Connecticut
Rivers of Hartford County, Connecticut
Rivers of Litchfield County, Connecticut
Tributaries of the Connecticut River
Rivers of Massachusetts
Rivers of Connecticut
Wild and Scenic Rivers of the United States